Cheltenham Avenue is a major east-west road in Southeastern Pennsylvania. It is served by many SEPTA bus routes, trolleys, regional rail, and subway. Cheltenham Avenue is an unsigned quadrant route t routes in Montgomery County, Pennsylvania. It also is a major borderline; it defines the border between Springfield and Cheltenham townships, and Cheltenham Township and the City of Philadelphia, with the latter also being the Montgomery County and Philadelphia County. A section of the road along the Philadelphia–Cheltenham border is part of PA Route 309.

Route description
Cheltenham Avenue has two sections, divided by Tookany Creek and SEPTA's Fox Chase regional rail line.

Western section

Cheltenham Avenue begins in Springfield Township at the intersection with Paper Mill Road. It runs southeast up a hill, where it passes LaSalle College High School and forms the border between Springfield and Cheltenham Township. Following several steep ascends and climbs, Springfield Township ends on the south side of the road, and the road begins as a border between Cheltenham and the City of Philadelphia, right near the Holy Sepulchre Cemetery.

Following a busy intersection with Easton Road, Cheltenham Avenue passes the Cedarbrook Shopping Center, and the Towers at Wyncote. Cheltenham Avenue then has another major intersection with Ogontz Avenue. This point begins the west end of the PA 309 overlap, as well as the end of the Fort Washington Expressway. The Greenleaf at Cheltenham shopping center also sits at the northeast corner of this intersection, as well as the Cheltenham-Ogontz Bus Loop, a major terminus for several SEPTA bus routes.

After crossing over Washington Lane, Cheltenham Avenue passes many strip malls and busy residential neighborhoods. After passing a small cemetery on the right (where the skyline of Philadelphia is just visible), Cheltenham Avenue intersects with the northern terminus of Broad Street. Immediately following the Broad Street intersection is the southern terminus of PA 309. Soon after, Cheltenham Avenue intersects PA 611 and historic Old York Road.

After these intersections, Cheltenham Avenue goes under several overpasses and winds its way to its at Tookany Creek Parkway/Crescentville Road, near the Tookany Creek. Final elevation is 66 feet above sea level.

Eastern section
Cheltenham Avenue begins again in the Lawndale section of the city, just east of the Fox Chase Line. It continues southeast through and intersects with several major streets such as Rising Sun Avenue and Tabor Avenue, at which it intersects with a US Defense Industrial Supply building and Fels Samuel High School.

After several blocks of row houses, Cheltenham Avenue hits Oxford Circle, a major intersection of the Roosevelt Boulevard (which carries US 1 and US 13), Oxford Avenue (PA 232), and Castor Avenue. It then continues through more row houses and passes to the northeast of Frankford Transportation Center, a major SEPTA stop and terminal for the Market-Frankford Line.

After passing by several cemeteries and Wissinoming Park, Cheltenham Avenue has major intersections with both Harbison Avenue and Torresdale Avenue. Cheltenham Avenue then winds through a few more blocks of houses, before it comes to its terminus at Keystone Street, just west of Amtrak's Northeast Corridor tracks, Interstate 95, and the Delaware River. Final elevation is 29 feet above sea level.

Attractions

Greenleaf at Cheltenham
Holy Sepulchre Cemetery
Camptown Historic District
Temple Stadium
Northwood Cemetery
North Cedar Hills Cemetery
Mount Carmel Cemetery
Cedar Hill Cemetery
Wissinoming Park
Mount Sinai Cemetery
Moss Playground

Public transportation

Cheltenham Avenue is a major thruway for many SEPTA bus, Regional Rail, and Subway routes.

Bus

1
6
14
16
18
20
22
24
25
26
28
55
56
57
58
67
70
73
77
80
84
88
H
XH
C (formerly)

Trackless Trolley
59
66

Subway
Market-Frankford Line

Regional Rail
Fox Chase Line
Main Line (Airport Line, Lansdale/Doylestown Line, Warminster Line, West Trenton Line)

Education
LaSalle College High School
Springfield Township High School (adjacent to western terminus)
Cheltenham High School (adjacent to beginning of PA-309 overlap)
Fels Samuel High School

Neighborhoods
Erdenheim
Wyndmoor
Laverock
Glenside
Wyncote
Cedarbrook
Stenton
La Mott
West Oak Lane
Elkins Park
Melrose Park
Oak Lane
Lawncrest
Oxford Circle
Northwood
Frankford
Wissinoming

History
The Philadelphia Rapid Transit Company (later became SEPTA) ran many trollies along Cheltenham Avenue, including the famous Route 6 which began service in 1907. It carried many Philadelphians from the Olney Transportation Center to Willow Grove Amusement Park. Trolley service from Cheltenham Avenue to Willow Grove ended in 1958, and the entire route was shut down and replaced by buses in 1985. Today, the route is covered by bus route 22.

References

External links

Former SEPTA Route 6

State highways in Pennsylvania
Streets in Philadelphia
Transportation in Pennsylvania